Monster Man is a 2003 American comedy horror film written and directed by Michael Davis. It stars Eric Jungmann, Justin Urich, Aimee Brooks, and Michael Bailey Smith. In Latin America, the film was released with the title Wrong Turn 2.

Plot
Adam (Eric Jungmann) and Harley (Justin Urich) drive a red 1970 Chevrolet Kingswood across the country so Adam can tell his ex-girlfriend Betty-Ann he still loves her before she gets married. After an encounter with a hearse, the two stop at a pub. They see a monster truck rally on TV and Harley mocks the people watching it. As they are driving away, a giant monster truck drives them off the road. Later on, they have to siphon gasoline from an abandoned RV. However, it is revealed that the RV has a mutilated body inside and the RV is surrounded by truck tracks that form a pentagram. Adam sees the strange-looking driver and Harley urinates in the cab of the monster truck before they speed away. At a hotel, Adam and Harley wake up with roadkill in their beds and find a hitchhiker named Sarah (Aimee Brooks) sleeping in the backseat when they get to the car. Sarah eventually has sex with Adam.

Later, they witness the monster truck run over a man and meet a man missing an arm who tells them the man in the monster truck takes people's limbs but lets the victims live. Afterwards, the three drive through a ghost town with many scarecrows. They find a diner at the end of the town and begin to eat, but Adam finds they are eating human flesh. They panic and run away. After being chased by the man in the monster truck, their car is destroyed. Adam, Harley, and Sarah run into the woods and the man follows them. He eventually catches up with them and shoves Harley into a tree, supposedly killing him, and kidnaps Sarah. Adam follows him to a shack covered with pentagrams, severed limbs, and a man whose entire middle section has been crushed. Adam finally finds Sarah and tries to escape, but Sarah knocks him unconscious. Sarah and the man, Bob (Michael Bailey Smith), are brother and sister. They tie Adam to a table while the "corpse" with the crushed midsection, Fred (Joe Goodrich), explains that Bob accidentally ran him over, crushing his midsection and sending Bob through the windshield. Sarah says she stitched Fred up and used black magic to bring him back to life. Fred explains that they can use other people's limbs to add to his own body as long as the donor stays alive and they could only transfer entire bodies if the body was prepared correctly.

Sarah says that they needed someone easy to prepare and Adam was the right person. Previous events begin to make sense to Adam. Everything that happened to Adam and Harley before was preparing Adam so that Fred could have his body: stepping into a pentagram with a mutilated body, sleeping with roadkill, Sarah having sex with him, and eating human flesh. Adam manages to escape and kills Sarah by slashing her throat. He also cuts Fred in half when he gets up and starts to attack him. Meanwhile, Bob locks the door.

Outside, Bob chases Adam, but is run over by his own monster truck driven by Harley. Harley remarks he was playing dead and apologizes to Adam for everything he did to him since the beginning of the film. He offers Adam the chance to drive Bob's monster truck, to which Adam happily agrees. Adam then runs over Bob with the monster truck repeatedly for hours. In the end, Adam thanks Harley for not only his help but the whole trip, calling him a good friend. When Harley mentions finishing the trip to Betty-Ann's wedding, Adam gives up on getting Betty-Ann to fall in love with him, and with that Harley then decides to get some food with Adam and they drive away. But as they leave, Bob's crushed body continues to call Adam a wuss while repeating the phrase "You Can't Kill Me !".

Cast
 Eric Jungmann as Adam
 Justin Urich as Harley
 Aimee Brooks as Sarah
 Michael Bailey Smith as Monster Man/Brother Bob
 Joe Goodrich as Brother Fred

Release

Home media
Monster Man was released on DVD by Lions Gate Home Entertainment on October 12, 2004. It was later released the following year by Tartan Video on June 27.

Reception

Monster Man received mixed reviews from critics upon its release. It currently has a 60% rating on Rotten Tomatoes, with five ratings.
Kim Newman from Empire Magazine awarded the film 3 out of 3 stars, writing, "Derivative of everything from Duel to Jeepers Creepers, this is good, trashy horror fun with a streak of Jackass-style grossness, some leftfield surprises and the always-reliable sense that the middle of America is a sucking pit of desperation that's out to get you." Arrow in the Head rated the film a score of 7/10, commending the film's cinematography, slick direction, and humor. The site concluded their review by writing, "With its strong dose of 'out of line' comedy, sometimes at the genre’s expense, and its extreme display of gory goods, Monster Man had me having a blast in my seat most of the time."

Time Out gave the film a negative review, writing, "Sporadically funny it may be, but it’s also stereotypical, clichéd, amateurish, stupid and often quite sick." Johnny Butane of Dread Central rated the film a score of 0.5 out of 5, stating that the film was neither funny or scary, also criticizing the film's annoying characters.

References

External links
 
 
 

2003 films
2000s adventure comedy films
2003 comedy horror films
2003 horror films
American adventure comedy films
American comedy horror films
Films directed by Michael Davis
Films shot in California
Incest in film
American independent films
2000s monster movies
Lionsgate films
Films about cannibalism
American monster movies
2003 comedy films
2000s English-language films
American road movies
2000s American films